Tell Zeitoun also called Tell Dnaibe, is an archaeological site  southwest of Rashaya in Lebanon at an altitude of .

It is situated in the valley of the Upper Hasbani (Wadi el-Fatir) on the right bank, north-east of the village of Dnaibe, east of the road. It was first recorded by A. Kuschke in 1954 followed by Lorraine Copeland and J. King in 1966 and lastly by Jacques Besançon and Francis Hours in 1968. Besançon recovered a fragment from an arrowhead a pick or hammer and a serrated sickle blade. These gave a very slight dating, suggesting Ubaid occupation equivalent to early neolithic Byblos.

References

External links 
 Atlas des sites Prochaine-Orient 14000 et 5700 BP - MOM's online application - Atlas of Near East Archaeological Sites 14000 to 5700 BP

1954 archaeological discoveries
Archaeological sites in Lebanon
Great Rift Valley
Neolithic settlements
Ubaid period